Severinske Drage Viaduct is located between the Bosiljevo 2 and Vrbovsko interchanges of the A6 motorway in Gorski Kotar, Croatia, just to the east of Veliki Gložac Tunnel. The viaduct consists of two parallel structures: The first one was completed in 2004, and the second one in 2007. The viaduct is tolled within the A6 motorway ticket system and there are no separate toll plazas associated with use of the viaduct. The viaduct was designed by Jure Radnić and constructed by Hidroelektra and Konstruktor.

Structure description
At this location the motorway route follows a horizontal curve of  radius. Transversal grade of the deck is constant and equal to 2.5%, while elevation grade of the eastern part (closer to Bosiljevo 2) of the viaduct is constant at 5.2505% while its western part (closer to Vrbovsko) follows a concave vertical curve of  radius. The viaduct is a beam structure supporting the deck slab across 18 spans:  + 16 x  + .

Superstructure of the viaduct consists of prestressed prefabricated girders executed as freely supported beams. As their longitudinal joints were concreted atop the viaduct piers they comprise continuous girders, made composite with the deck slab using standard reinforcing steel.

Traffic volume
Traffic is regularly counted and reported by Autocesta Rijeka–Zagreb, operator of the viaduct and the A6 motorway where the structure is located, and published by Hrvatske ceste. Substantial variations between annual (AADT) and summer (ASDT) traffic volumes are attributed to the fact that the bridge carries substantial tourist traffic to the Adriatic resorts. The traffic count is performed using analysis of motorway toll ticket sales.

See also
List of bridges by length

References

External links
Autocesta Rijeka–Zagreb: Severinske Drage Viaduct webcam

Plate girder bridges
Bridges completed in 2004
Toll bridges in Croatia
Viaducts in Croatia
Buildings and structures in Primorje-Gorski Kotar County
Transport in Primorje-Gorski Kotar County